Pazz & Jop was an annual poll of top musical releases, compiled by American newspaper The Village Voice and created by music critic Robert Christgau. It published lists of the year's top releases for 1971 and, after Christgau's two-year absence from the Voice, each year from 1974 onward. The polls are tabulated from the submitted year-end top 10 lists of hundreds of music critics. It was named in acknowledgement of the defunct magazine Jazz & Pop, and adopted the ratings system used in that publication's annual critics poll.

The Pazz & Jop was introduced by The Village Voice in 1971 as an album-only poll; it was expanded to include votes for singles in 1979. Throughout the years, other minor lists had been elicited from poll respondents for releases such as extended plays, music videos, album re-issues, and compilation albums—all of which were discontinued after only a few years. The Pazz & Jop albums poll uses a points system to formulate list rankings. Participating critics assigned a number value, ranging from 5 to 30, to each of the albums on their top 10 list, with all 10 albums totaling 100 points. The singles lists, however, are always unweighted.

History
The Pazz & Jop was created by Village Voice critic Robert Christgau. The idea behind its name (a spoonerism of Jazz & Pop) was that, since the words "pazz" and "jop" do not exist, participating critics would judge a musical work on its own merits rather than be distracted by categories and genres. In 1971, English rock band the Who topped the first Pazz & Jop albums poll with Who's Next. The following year, Christgau left The Village Voice for Newsday, and the poll was not conducted again until 1974, when Christgau returned to the Voice and the poll "became an institution", according to fellow Voice critic Chris Molanphy. English singer Ian Dury and his band the Blockheads topped the first singles poll with "Hit Me with Your Rhythm Stick" (1979). Bob Dylan and Kanye West topped the albums poll the most number of times, with four number-one albums each. West, in addition, won the singles poll of 2005. Christgau oversaw the Pazz & Jop poll for more than thirty years; he also wrote an accompanying essay that discussed the poll's contents.

Writing in 2002, author Bernard Gendron cited the lack of overlap between the 1999 poll results and that year's best-selling albums on Billboards US charts—whereby only five of Pazz & Jop's top 40 appeared in the Billboard list—as indicative of a continued division between the avant-garde aesthetic of cultural accreditation and commercial considerations. Although Pazz & Jop established itself as a critics' poll with a clear identity, it has attracted criticism, particularly for its methodology. Addressing the participants in 2001, Mike Doughty of the New York Press complained: "In the guise of a love of music, you've taken the most beautiful nebulous form of human expression, squeezed it through an asinine points-scoring system specially cooked up for this pointless perennial, and forced it into this baffling, heinous chart system."

Christgau's tenure as Pazz & Jop overseer came to an abrupt end when he was controversially fired from The Village Voice after a company buy-out in August 2006. In response to his dismissal, several prominent critics publicly announced that they would no longer be turning in their lists for the poll; Sasha Frere-Jones of The New Yorker described Christgau's firing as "a slap in the face to so many of us [critics] in so many ways". Regardless, The Village Voice continued to run the feature, with Rob Harvilla succeeding Christgau as music editor and overseer of the poll. Christgau's annual Pazz & Jop overview essay was discontinued and substituted with multiple retrospective articles of the year's music written by a selection of critics.

In 2016, the poll's name was changed from Pazz & Jop to the Village Voice Music Critics Poll by the new owners of the newspaper. Christgau, who had continued to vote in the poll since his departure from the newspaper, expressed dismay at the name change. When the 2016 results were announced in January 2017, the poll had reverted to its Pazz & Jop name.

The Village Voice ceased publication altogether in August 2018. Despite the closure of the newspaper, a Pazz & Jop poll for 2018 was announced on December 20, with Christgau confirming its legitimacy on Twitter. The 2018 poll was published on the Village Voice's website on February 6, 2019.

As a continuation of the poll, Glenn Boothe and Keith Artin organised a "Village Voice Pazz & Jop Rip-Off Poll" in 2019. The poll was conduced via private Facebook group and included over 1,100 members—music writers, business execs, or artists themselves. Purple Mountains' eponymous album was voted the best album of 2019.

Albums voted number one

Singles voted number one

Defunct categories

Compilation albums

Album re-issues

Extended plays

Music videos

References

External links
 Official Pazz & Jop page at The Village Voice
 Pazz & Jop polls and essays by Robert Christgau (from 1971−2007)

The Village Voice
1971 introductions
2018 disestablishments in New York (state)
Opinion polling in the United States
Lists of albums
Lists of songs
Lists of music videos